The 2021–22 Arizona Coyotes season was the 43rd season for the National Hockey League (NHL) franchise that was established on June 22, 1979, the 26th season since the franchise relocated from Winnipeg following the 1995–96 NHL season, and the 50th overall season, including the World Hockey Association years.

The Coyotes returned to the Central Division for the 2021–22 season. The franchise was previously part of this division from the time of its formation in 1993 (when the team was still based in Manitoba) through to the end of its second season in Arizona in 1998. The modern Winnipeg Jets are also in the Central, thus for the first time that city's original NHL franchise will be in the same division as its current team. The league's new expansion team the Seattle Kraken took the Coyotes' place in the Pacific Division.

This was the Coyotes' final season at Gila River Arena, as the city of Glendale decided not to renew the team's operating agreement with the city. The Coyotes finished with 57 points, the worst record in the whole Western Conference.

They were eliminated from playoff contention following a 6–1 loss to the Edmonton Oilers on March 28, 2022. The Coyotes closed Gila River Arena by beating the Predators, 5-4, after trailing 4-0, in the season finale. Coincidentally, the Predators beat the then-Phoenix Coyotes, 3-1, in their first home game at Gila River Arena  on December 27, 2003. It was known as Glendale Arena at the time.

Standings

Divisional standings

Conference standings

Schedule and results

Preseason
The team's preseason schedule was released on August 9, 2021.

Regular season
The team's regular season schedule was published on July 22, 2021, with only about a handful of games scheduled in February because NHL players are planning to participate in the 2022 Winter Olympics.

Player statistics

Skaters

Goaltenders

†Denotes player spent time with another team before joining the Coyotes. Stats reflect time with the Coyotes only.
‡Denotes player was traded mid-season. Stats reflect time with the Coyotes only.
Bold/italics denotes franchise record.

Transactions
The Coyotes have been involved in the following transactions during the 2021–22 season.

Trades

Notes:
 Arizona will receive the earliest of either the Colorado Avalanche's or the New York Islanders' second-round pick in 2022.
 Arizona will receive a third-round pick in 2023 if Ladd does not play in any professional games in 2022–23 under his current contract and does not retire prior to the conclusion of the 2022–23 regular season; otherwise no pick will be exchanged.
 Arizona will receive a 3rd-round pick in 2023 if the Dallas Stars qualify for the 2022 Stanley Cup playoffs.

Players acquired

Players lost

Signings

Draft picks

Below are the Arizona Coyotes selections at the 2021 NHL Entry Draft, which will be held on July 23 and 24, 2021, virtually via video conference call from the NHL Network studio in Secaucus, New Jersey, due to the COVID-19 pandemic.

Notes
 The Arizona Coyotes' first-round pick will be forfeited as the result of a penalty sanction due to violations of the NHL Combine Testing Policy during the 2019–20 NHL season. The penalty includes the forfeiture of a second-round pick in 2020 and this pick.

References

Arizona Coyotes seasons
2021–22 NHL season by team
2021 in sports in Arizona
Coyotes